Nitrica is a village and municipality in Prievidza District in the Trenčín Region of western Slovakia.

History
The first written mention of the village dates back to 1113, when the upper part of the village called Račice was mentioned, which today forms the upper part of the current village. By merging both parts of the village in 1960, the current village of Nitrica was created.

No written reports have been preserved about the development of the village. It is known from the oral narratives of older people that the inhabitants here were engaged in agriculture, small-scale trade and selling fruit, and in the earliest times also selling clay vessels that they made themselves. The main source of livelihood for the local population was fruit growing associated with trade. After the first merchants from Račíce and Dvorník, the local nickname "korenári" (root-salesmen) is used to this day - after the merchants who traded in spices, mainly saffron.

Monuments and sights
A new church dedicated to St. Michael was built in the village in 2013, and there is a chapel dedicated to the Divine Heart of Jesus, which was built in 1919 by Michal Šramka and his wife Karolína in memory of their two sons who died in the World War on the Russian battlefield.

Geography
The municipality lies at an altitude of 246 metres and covers an area of 24.034 km². It has a population of about 1260 people.

References

External links
 
 
http://www.statistics.sk/mosmis/eng/run.html

Villages and municipalities in Prievidza District